The 2002 Belgian Cup Final, took place on 9 May 2002 between Club Brugge and Mouscron. It was the 47th Belgian Cup final and was won by Club Brugge.

Route to the final

Match

Details

External links
  

Belgian Cup finals
Cup Final
Belgian Cup final 2002